The Master Detective is a 1933 German comedy crime film directed by Franz Seitz and starring Weiß Ferdl, Ery Bos and Hans Stüwe. It was shot at the Bavaria Studios in Munich. The film's sets were designed by the art director Max Seefelder.

Plot
A snooping busybody considers himself a great investigator. When his niece acquires a new boyfriend he decides to check out his background. Unwittingly, however, he becomes mixed up in a real crime.

Cast
Weiß Ferdl as Jakob Hase, gen. d. "Schnauzer"
Ery Bos as Alice Radley
Hans Stüwe as Max Müller
Rolf von Goth as Fritz Körner
Fritz Kampers as Paul Krause
Joe Stöckel as Dr. Flint
Ria Waldau as Betty - Jakobs Nichte
Therese Giehse as Frl. Holzapfel

References

External links

1930s crime comedy films
Films of Nazi Germany
German crime comedy films
Films directed by Franz Seitz
Bavaria Film films
Films shot at Bavaria Studios
German black-and-white films
1933 comedy films
1930s German films